Water polo at the 2010 Asian Games was held in Guangzhou, Guangdong, China from November 13 to 25, 2010. In this tournament, 9 teams played in the men's competition, while the woman's tournament made their first participation with 4 teams.

Schedule

Medalists

Medal table

Draw
The draw ceremony for the team sports was held on 7 October 2010 at Guangzhou. The men were drawn into two groups of five teams, the women were played in round robin format. The teams were seeded based on their final ranking at the 2009 Asian Championships.

Group A
 (Host)
 (3)

Group B
 (2)
 Athletes from Kuwait (4)

*

* Iran withdrew shortly after the draw.

Final standing

Men

Women

References

External links
Waterpolo Site of 2010 Asian Games

 
2010
2010 Asian Games events
Asian
2010 Asian Games